Mwense District is a district of Zambia, located in Luapula Province. The capital lies at Mwense. As of the 2000 Zambian Census, the district had a population of 105,759 people.

Its top tourist attraction is the Mumbuluma falls, which is a set of waterfalls and are a national monument of Zambia. The Falls is made up of two waterfalls occurring in succession, an upper and lower falls.

The district is also home to the Mambilima falls, which is a series of rapids in the Luapula river, about 50 km from the Mumbuluma falls on the border between Zambia and the Democratic Republic of Congo.

References

Districts of Luapula Province